The Lumding–Sabroom section is a railway line under Lumding railway division of Northeast Frontier Railway zone of Indian Railways. It is a single  broad-gauge track from Lumding in Nagaon District of Assam state to Agartala in West Tripura district of Tripura state. The 43 km-long  segment from Agartala southwards to Udaipur, Tripura was completed in 2016 and became operational on 23 January 2017. The remaining 70 km long track to Sabroom at the bank of Feni River at Bangladesh border was completed in 2019 and became operational on 3 October 2019.

History
Railway service was established in Tripura in 1964 by constructing metre gauge track from Karimganj to Dharmanagar and Kailashahar in Tripura, but the track did not connect the state capital Agartala. The foundation stone of the 119 km Kumarghat–Agartala railway line project was laid in 1996. The 87 km-long segment from Lumding to Agartala became operational in 2008. It was a metre-gauge single track without electrification and was converted to  broad gauge in 2016. A new 43 km-long track was laid from Agartala to Udaipur, Tripura in 2017. The remaining 70 km long track to Sabroom at the bank of Feni River at Bangladesh border was completed by 2019 and became operational on 3 October 2019.

Future construction
The track may be extended further from Sabroom  to Chittagong port which is 75 km from the India–Bangladesh border. A branch line from Agartala to Akhaura in Bangladesh, is under construction. This line will reduce the distance between Kolkata and Agartala to about 500 km, from current about 1500 km via Guwahati.

See also

Guwahati–Silchar Express

References

External links
 Indiarailinfo
 Erail

5 ft 6 in gauge railways in India
Rail transport in Assam
Rail transport in Tripura

2008 establishments in India
Transport in Agartala
Transport in Lumding